Ramona Pop (born 5 April 1982) is a Romanian athlete and former high jump national champion for her country. She has been junior champion, national champion, and national indoor champion. Her personal best was 1.92m (22 July 2001) and 1.90m indoor (17 February 2002).

References

1982 births
Living people
Romanian female high jumpers
Place of birth missing (living people)
21st-century Romanian people